Qaşqaçay (also, Kashkachay) is a village and municipality in the Qakh Rayon of Azerbaijan. It has a population of 1,495. The municipality consists of the villages of Qaşqaçay, Ashagı Malakh and Armudlu.

Notable natives 

 Javanshir Rahimov — National Hero of Azerbaijan.

References 

Populated places in Qakh District